Black Sox may refer to:

Black Sox Scandal, a 1919 Major League Baseball gambling scandal
Curse of the Black Sox, a long-persisting sports curse associated with the Black Sox scandal
Black Socks, the New Zealand men's softball team
Baltimore Black Sox, a former African American league baseball team
Les Chaussettes Noires (The Black Socks), a French rock and roll band